Queenwood is a suburb in northern Hamilton in New Zealand. This place is separated by Chartwell Park from Chartwell. It is mostly a residential area, with the typical range of local shops. It is located between River Road and Hukanui Road.

Demographics

Queenwood had a population of 2,382 at the 2018 New Zealand census, an increase of 117 people (5.2%) since the 2013 census, and an increase of 144 people (6.4%) since the 2006 census. There were 864 households, comprising 1,149 males and 1,233 females, giving a sex ratio of 0.93 males per female. The median age was 41.1 years (compared with 37.4 years nationally), with 456 people (19.1%) aged under 15 years, 450 (18.9%) aged 15 to 29, 1,062 (44.6%) aged 30 to 64, and 414 (17.4%) aged 65 or older.

Ethnicities were 82.2% European/Pākehā, 12.8% Māori, 3.0% Pacific peoples, 12.3% Asian, and 2.0% other ethnicities. People may identify with more than one ethnicity.

The percentage of people born overseas was 22.7, compared with 27.1% nationally.

Although some people chose not to answer the census's question about religious affiliation, 50.5% had no religion, 39.0% were Christian, 0.4% had Māori religious beliefs, 1.4% were Hindu, 0.6% were Muslim, 1.0% were Buddhist and 1.6% had other religions.

Of those at least 15 years old, 612 (31.8%) people had a bachelor's or higher degree, and 207 (10.7%) people had no formal qualifications. The median income was $38,100, compared with $31,800 nationally. 489 people (25.4%) earned over $70,000 compared to 17.2% nationally. The employment status of those at least 15 was that 969 (50.3%) people were employed full-time, 285 (14.8%) were part-time, and 63 (3.3%) were unemployed.

See also
 List of streets in Hamilton
Suburbs of Hamilton, New Zealand

References

Suburbs of Hamilton, New Zealand
Populated places on the Waikato River